Rissoidae is a large family of very small and minute sea snails with an operculum, marine gastropod mollusks in the superfamily Rissooidea and the order Littorinimorpha.

Distribution and habitat
This family of snails is found worldwide. They live on sandy or gravel bottoms among algae or marine plants. They are also found under rocks in crevices or sheltered places.

Subfamilies 
The classification within this family was a long time not clarified. The number of genera and subgenera was subject to the individual interpretation of the researcher.
The following subfamilies were recognized in the taxonomy of Bouchet & Rocroi of 2005:
 Rissoinae Gray, 1847
 Rissoininae Stimpson, 1865
In 2013 the subfamily Rissoininae was elevated to the rank of family Rissoinidae by Criscione F. & Ponder W.F.

Genera
Genera within the family Rissoidae include:

 Alvania Risso, 1826
 Amphirissoa Dautzenberg & Fischer, 1897
 Archaschenia Zhgenti, 1981 †
 Benthonella Dall, 1889
 Benthonellania Lozouet, 1990
 Boreocingula Golikov and Kussakin, 1974
 Boreomica Guzhov, 2017 †
 Botryphallus Ponder, 1990
 Calvadosiella Wenz, 1939 †
 Cingula Fleming, 1828
 Crisilla Monterosato, 1917
 Frigidoalvania Waren, 1974
 Galeodinopsis Sacco, 1895
 Gofasia Bouchet & Warén, 1993
 Haurakia Iredale, 1915
 Hirsonella J. C. Fischer, 1969 †
 Ihungia Marwick, 1931 †
 Koskinakra Kadolsky, 2016 †
 Lucidestea Laseron, 1956
 Madeiranzonia Moolenbeek & Faber, 2007
 Manzonia Brusina, 1870
 Mohrensternia Stoliczka, 1868 †
 Obtusella Cossmann, 1921
 Omanimerelina Moolenbeek & Bosch, 2007
 Onoba H. Adams and A. Adams, 1852
 Paleoceratia Gründel, 1999 †
 Parashiela Laseron, 1956
 Peringiella Monterosato, 1878
 Plagyostila Folin, 1872
 Pontiturboella Sitnikova, Starobogatov, Anistratenko, 1992
 Porosalvania Gofas, 2007
 Powellisetia Ponder, 1965
 Pseudosetia Monterosato, 1884
 Punctulum Jeffreys, 1884
 Pusillina Monterosato, 1884
 Pyrgosformisia Barros, S. Lima & D. Tenório, 2018
 Quarkia Faber, 2009
 Rissoa  Desmarest, 1814
 Setia H. and A. Adams, 1852
 Simulamerelina Ponder, 1985
 Striatestea Powell, 1927
 Subestea Cotton, 1944
 Subonoba Iredale, 1915
 Thierachella J. C. Fischer, 1969 †
 Trochoturbella Cossmann, 1921 †
 Vitricithra Laseron, 1956
 Voorwindia Ponder, 1985
 Zhgentia Iljina, 2006 †

Taxon inquirendum
 Flemingia Jeffreys, 1884
 † Paryphostoma Bayan, 1873
 Polyhyba Haas, 1947

Genera brought into synonymy
 Adolphinoba Powell, 1930: synonym of Attenuata Hedley, 1918
 Alvinia Monterosato, 1884: synonym of Alvania Risso, 1826
 Ameririssoa Ponder, 1985: synonym of Alvania Risso, 1826
 Apicularia Monterosato, 1884: synonym of Rissoa Desmarest, 1814
 Auriconoba Nordsieck, 1972: synonym of Rissoa Desmarest, 1814
 Flemellia Nordsieck, 1972: synonym of Alvania Risso, 1826
 Galeodina Monterosato, 1884: synonym of Alvania Risso, 1826
 Goniostoma Villa, 1841: synonym of Rissoa Desmarest, 1814
 Gueriniana Nordsieck, 1972: synonym of Rissoa Desmarest, 1814
 Haurakiopsis A. W. B. Powell, 1937: synonym of Haurakia Iredale, 1915
 Lamarckia Leach, 1852: synonym of Rissoa Desmarest, 1814
 Lilacinia Nordsieck, 1972: synonym of Rissoa Desmarest, 1814
 Linemera Finlay, 1924: synonym of Alvania Risso, 1826
 Loxostoma Bivona-Bernardi, 1838: synonym of Rissoa Desmarest, 1814
 Manawatawhia Powell, 1937: synonym of Onoba (Manawatawhia) Powell, 1937 represented as Onoba H. Adams & A. Adams, 1852
 Massotia Bucquoy, Dautzenberg & Dollfus, 1884: synonym of Alvania Risso, 1826
 Mereliniopsis Ponder, 1967: synonym of Merelina Iredale, 1915
 Moniziella Nordsieck, 1972: synonym of Alvania Risso, 1826
 Nobolira Finlay, 1926: synonym of Attenuata Hedley, 1918
 Ovirissoa Hedley, 1916: synonym of Onoba (Ovirissoa) Hedley, 1916 represented as Onoba H. Adams & A. Adams, 1852
 Parvisetia Monterosato, 1884: synonym of Setia H. Adams & A. Adams, 1852
 Persephona Leach, 1852: synonym of Rissoa Desmarest, 1814
 Plagiostyla Fischer, 1872: synonym of Plagyostila de Folin, 1872
 Promerelina Powell, 1926: synonym of Merelina Iredale, 1915
 Radiata Nordsieck, 1972: synonym of Pusillina Monterosato, 1884
 Rissoia Bronn, 1848: synonym of Rissoa Desmarest, 1814
 Rissostomia G. O. Sars, 1878: synonym of Rissoa Desmarest, 1814
 Rudolphosetia Monterosato, 1917: synonym of Setia H. Adams & A. Adams, 1852
 Sabanea Monterosato, 1884: synonym of Rissoa Desmarest, 1814
 Schwartzia Bucquoy, Dautzenberg & Dollfus, 1884: synonym of Rissoa Desmarest, 1814
 Sfaxiella Nordsieck, 1972: synonym of Rissoa Desmarest, 1814
 Turboella Leach, 1847: synonym of Rissoa Desmarest, 1814
 Turgidina Verduin, 1979: synonym of Pusillina Monterosato, 1884
 Zippora Leach, 1852: synonym of Rissoa Desmarest, 1814

References

 
Taxa named by John Edward Gray